Salah Obeid  is a former Iraqi football forward who played for Iraq in the 1974 FIFA World Cup qualification.

Career statistics

International goals
Scores and results list Iraq's goal tally first.

References

Iraqi footballers
Iraq international footballers
Living people
Association football forwards
Year of birth missing (living people)